Bygrave is a village and civil parish in the North Hertfordshire district of Hertfordshire, England, about 2 miles north-east of Baldock.  In the 10th century the parish was called Bigraffan and 11th to 16th centuries Bigrave. According to the 2011 census it had a population of 306. A reservoir is situated behind the Old Rectory and used for irrigation of potato crops by Manor Farm.

The village stands on a clay-capped hill, a defensive position where the original settlement was surrounded by moats built in 1386 which can still be seen today. From these defences, the whole parish bounded by Icknield Way, the Great North Road, the Cat Ditch and a ridge to the north would have been visible.

The village church is St Margaret's and is dedicated to St Margaret of Antioch, while the site on which it stands dates from at least Saxon times with two phases of Saxon construction from 8th-10th centuries. Some Romano-British pottery, pre-dating the present church by several centuries was found under the north nave wall indicating a much earlier settlement on this site. This church has carvings of the ancient game of Nine Men Morris on the frames of the chancel windows. There are wall paintings that date from the mid fifteenth century. A notable rector here was George Coke who went on to be the bishop of Hereford. The Church is open at weekends only and the key is available from the churchwardens.

The peaceful lane leading to the church was once the centre of a busy village and known as the Market Place and flourished between the 13th and 15th centuries. There was a 3-day annual fair beginning at the feast of St Margaret. The date was changed to Easter Monday and survived until Victorian days.

The Manor Farm has contributed much to the life of this village, from when most people living there were actually employed on the farm, to the present day. Sheep are still grazed on the Common.

There is also a tiny airfield used for microlight aircraft.

Sport and Leisure

Croquet
Bygrave Croquet Club is based at The Moat House. The club is affiliated to the Croquet Association and is a member of the East Anglia Croquet Federation. The club has five Garden Croquet lawns and meets weekly usually on Fridays. Members also play Association Croquet and are active in Regional and National competitions.

Handbell Ringing
The Bygrave Handbell Ringers were formed in 1999 with the idea of ringing in the millennium. The team has 13 members and meets every week at The Moat House. They give many public performances in the community each year including the  Carol Service at St Margaret's Church on Christmas Eve. Their strangest concert was in the Baldock Bypass tunnel before it was opened to traffic in 2006.

References

External links
 Bygrave Croquet Club Web Site
Bygrave Handbell Ringers Web Site

Villages in Hertfordshire
Civil parishes in Hertfordshire